The 2000 Barcelona Dragons season was the eighth season for the franchise in the NFL Europe League (NFLEL). The team was led by head coach Jack Bicknell in his eighth year, and played its home games at Estadi Olímpic de Montjuïc in Barcelona, Catalonia, Spain. They finished the regular season in third place with a record of five wins and five losses.

Personnel

Staff

Roster

Schedule

Standings

Notes

References

Barcelona
Barcelona Dragons seasons